Save the Elephants (STE) is a UK registered charity based in Kenya founded in September 1993 by Iain Douglas-Hamilton. Save the Elephants works to sustain elephant populations and preserve the habitats in which elephants are found, while at the same time fostering a heightened appreciation and visibility for elephants and their often fragile existence. The organization uses a four pillar approach to fulfill its mission statement, combining habitat protection, research, grass roots organization and involvement, and through disseminating information through television, films, publications and new media sources.

Save the Elephants has been instrumental in helping to revitalize African elephant populations, while at the same time, increasing awareness in the many issues which threaten to erode elephant populations and the habitats in which they live. Iain Douglas Hamilton has played an integral role in stopping the illegal ivory trade throughout the world, while at the same time raising the profile of elephant conservation and awareness.

Projects
Primarily based in Samburu National Reserve in the Great Rift Valley of Kenya, Save the Elephants carries out rigorous studies of elephants, including elephant collaring and more recently, sophisticated elephant tracking techniques.

Protection

STE works on three fronts to stop the killing of elephants: anti-poaching, and enhancing anti-poaching efforts of others through our GPS tracking; antitrafficking, through initiatives to disrupt criminal networks and ensure enforcement; and demand reduction, by sharing awareness of the impacts of buying ivory with the top consumer nations.

Research
Save the Elephants conducts vital Research on elephant behaviour and ecology and pioneered GPS radio tracking in Africa to provide fresh insight into the secret life of elephants. After over 15 years of intensive monitoring the elephants of Samburu are one of the world's best-studied populations. The organisation also assists in implementing a UN-level programme to monitor the illegal killing of elephants and solid scientific data has helped shift international policy towards a future for the species.

Awareness

Elephants are intelligent creatures with complex levels of consciousness and STE intends to bring this to the world's
attention. They disseminate this locally and internationally through films, publications, a computerised elephant library, a news service, social networks and the website. They involve local people in research and education to develop a conservation ethic based on local knowledge and elephant needs, and recognize that the best potential ambassadors for elephants are the people with whom they share their land.

Human Elephant Conflict

Beyond the current poaching crisis lies a deeper threat to the future of elephants. The human footprint is rapidly expanding across Africa but elephants need large ranges to survive. By understanding elephant needs and movements through GPS tracking research Save the Elephants is working to preserve vital migration corridors and ensure an elephant-friendly landscape. Where people and elephants already collide, the Elephants and Bees project is proof that win-win solutions exist.

Elephants and Bees

STE started a charity, Elephants and Bees, that uses african bees to reduce the problem of elephants destroying crops on small farms in Africa and Asia.

Ivory Ella

News service
The latest knowledge about elephants is important for scientists, conservationists and the interested public. Save the Elephants gathers all articles, stories and publications from the around the world and distributes them to subscribers as well as storing them in a free library on our website, creating a substantial resource for elephant enthusiasts all over the world. 

Please note that this service reflects stories published on established news outlets, but Save the Elephants cannot guarantee the accuracy of any news story. In addition, we do not endorse any of the views expressed therein. We simply try to represent fairly what is in the media on elephants. If a reader finds inaccuracies in an article, we are happy to circulate corrections, if these can be verified.  Between the African and Asian news services the email list has grown to over 4000 members worldwide including scientists, students, conservationists, policy makers, park managers and zookeepers.

Films
Save the Elephants has been featured in numerous film, television and print articles, including National Geographic. The BBC Natural History Unit series The Secret Life of Elephants, screened in 2009, featured Iain and his work.

Save the Elephants has teamed up with Google Earth Outreach to efficiently track and protect herds of African Elephants from poachers. This partnership has given them the ability to monitor migration movements and notify the Kenyan Wildlife Service if anything seems to have gone awry. Save the elephants is also partnered with the Wildlife Conservation Network

References

External links
Save the Elephants Homepage

Wildlife conservation in Kenya
Nature conservation organisations based in the United Kingdom
Animal charities based in the United Kingdom
Elephant conservation organizations
Organizations established in 1993
Animal welfare organisations based in Kenya